The Fabulous Rock 'n' Roll Songbook is a studio album by Cliff Richard. Promoted as his 100th album, the album was released through the Warner Music imprint Rhino Records on 11 November 2013 and is made up of 14 covers of classic rock 'n' roll songs and one new song "One More Sunny Day".  
 
The album reached number 7 in the UK Albums Chart and was certified gold for sales over 100,000 in the UK.

The album was recorded live at the Blackbird Studio and at The Parlor in Nashville, Tennessee, as a tribute to the greats of rock 'n' roll who inspired and influenced Cliff, including Elvis Presley, Buddy Holly, Jerry Lee Lewis, Chuck Berry, The Everly Brothers and Little Richard. The album is produced by Steve Mandile and Eddie Healy is the executive producer.  
 
The debut single from the album is a cover of the hit "Rip It Up", recorded by Little Richard in 1956 and also that year by Bill Haley and His Comets, it was released as Cliff Richard's 140th single.

In the US, the album was released on 25 February 2014 through Friday Music.

Track listing

Charts and certifications

Weekly charts

Year-end charts

Certifications

References

2013 albums
Cliff Richard albums
Covers albums
British rock-and-roll albums